Puğkaracadağ is a village in Akdeniz district of Mersin Province, Turkey, where the capital city of Akdeniz district is actually a part of Greater Mersin. The village is situated on the north of Çukurova motorway. The creek Deliçay is to the west. The population of the village was 687 as of 2012.

References

Villages in Akdeniz District